Ginseng is an unincorporated community located in LaRue County, Kentucky, United States. The town was named for the crop ginseng, which was harvested by locals to be sold at market in Elizabethtown, Kentucky. Its post office, opened in 1898 with Charles Merrill as its postmaster was closed in 1957.

References

Unincorporated communities in LaRue County, Kentucky
Unincorporated communities in Kentucky